Quentin Ivory Lowry (born November 11, 1955) is a former American football linebacker in the National Football League (NFL) for the Washington Redskins and Tampa Bay Buccaneers. He played college football at Youngstown State University. He played high school football at Shaker Heights High School

Early years
Lowry attended Shaker Heights High School, where he received All-League and All-District honors. He accepted a scholarship from Division II Youngstown State University.

As a sophomore, he became a starter at defensive end, registering 105 tackles (11 for loss) and 3 fumble recoveries. The next year, he had 32 tackles (2 for loss) and one interception.

As a senior, he was a stand-up defensive end with pass coverage responsibilities. He posted 94 tackles (21 for loss) and 5 fumble recoveries, while helping his team reach the 1978 Mid-Continent Conference Championship and the quarterfinals of the NCAA Division II Playoffs. His teammate Greg Fitzpatrick was also drafted by the Dallas Cowboys.

He finished his career with 231 tackles (34 for loss), 8 fumble recoveries and one interception. In 1999, he was inducted into the Youngstown State University Athletics Hall of Fame.

On May 6, 1978 Lowry participated as an amateur heavyweight boxer in Sigma Epsilon Fraternity "Fight Nite" at the Youngstown State University Beegly Center Arena.  He defeated Carmine Zarlenga, now a Washington, DC litigation attorney, in the match.

Professional career

Dallas Cowboys
Lowry was selected by the Dallas Cowboys in the twelfth round (329th overall) of the 1979 NFL Draft, with the intention of playing him at outside linebacker. He was waived on August 6.

Los Angeles Rams
In 1980, he was signed by the Los Angeles Rams. He was released on August 19.

Hamilton-Tiger Cats (CFL)
In March 1981, he was signed by the Hamilton Tiger-Cats of the Canadian Football League. He was released before the start of the season.

Washington Redskins
In 1981, he was signed by the Washington Redskins. On August 24, he was placed on the injured reserve list with a thigh injury and returned to play in 9 games mainly on special teams.

He was released on September 5, 1982. He was recalled on September 7 and played in 9 games. He was a part of the Super Bowl XVII winning team.

Lowry was cut on August 28, 1983. On September 20, he was re-signed to replace Monte Coleman who was placed on the injured reserve list.

Tampa Bay Buccaneers
On November 3, he was signed as a free agent by the Tampa Bay Buccaneers. On December 15, he was placed on the injured reserve list with a knee injury.

Personal life
His brother Orlando played in the National Football League for the Indianapolis Colts. Lowry currently lives in Maryland with his wife Tammy, and daughters Tai and Kelli.

References

External links
YSU Athletics Hall of Fame bio

1955 births
Living people
Players of American football from Cleveland
American football linebackers
Youngstown State Penguins football players
Washington Redskins players
Tampa Bay Buccaneers players